Frank Kalil (born September 1, 1959) is a former American football center.

Pro career
Kalil was drafted in the 11th round with the 298th pick in the 1982 NFL Draft by the Buffalo Bills as an offensive guard.  Kalil played professionally in the USFL. Kalil played for the Arizona Wranglers from 1982 to 1983 then later played for the Houston Gamblers from 1984 to 1985.

College career
Kalil started at the University of Arkansas in 1978 and 1979 but later transferred and graduated from the University of Arizona between 1980 and 1982.

High school career
Kalil played at Servite High School in Anaheim, CA.

Personal
Kalil's son Ryan Kalil played collegiately for the USC Trojans before being drafted in the second round of the 2007 NFL Draft by the Carolina Panthers.  USC coach Pete Carroll and USC offensive line coach Pat Ruel were both at Arkansas when Frank Kalil played there.  His other son, Matt Kalil was a top prospect in high school and also played for USC before being drafted #4 overall by the Minnesota Vikings in the 2012 NFL Draft.

References

1959 births
Living people
American people of Lebanese descent
Arizona Wildcats football players
Arkansas Razorbacks football players
Players of American football from Arizona
People from Pima County, Arizona
Servite High School alumni
Sportspeople of Lebanese descent